Albert Lieven (born Albert Fritz Liévin; 22 June 1906 – 22 December 1971) was a German actor.

Early life
Lieven was born in Hohenstein, East Prussia (Olszynek, Poland). His father was the head physician of the Tuberculosis sanatorium Hohenstein, where Lieven grew up. He started to study medicine but stopped the studies for financial reasons.

Career
Lieven started his career at theaters in Gera and Königsberg. His first screen role was in the German film Annemarie, die Braut der Kompanie (Bride of the Company) in 1932. During the next four years he appeared in another sixteen films, including the German film adaptation of Charley's Aunt.

Owing to the rise of the Nazi Party in Germany and his wife Tatjana being Jewish, they moved to Britain in 1937. However, he spent the years of the Second World War mainly in roles depicting Nazis in British films, not finding them overly challenging as an actor.

Lieven appeared on the London stage in 1939 in the comedy Rake's Progress (not the later Rex Harrison film of the same title), but was largely acting in films (among them The Life and Death of Colonel Blimp, 1943). In 1943 he appeared in the West End production The Lisbon Story.

Lieven appeared in many cinema productions, and in 1940, he was credited in seven, in all of which he played the role of a German.

He was under contract to Rank for five years from 1945. It has been claimed that he only appeared in one film during this contract, Sleeping Car to Trieste. In fact, however, he appeared in several other films for companies controlled by Rank during this period, as part of his contract. These included Marry Me! (1949), which was made for Gainsborough Pictures, which by that date was a subsidiary of Rank.

He returned to Germany in 1951, and appeared in many films made there. He also was in films both in Britain and Hollywood.

Family
Married four times, Lieven is the grandfather of the England rugby union player Toby Flood. Lieven died in London.

Selected filmography

 Annemarie, die Braut der Kompanie (1932) as Fähnrich Werner v. Schumann
 I by Day, You by Night (1932) as Wolf
 Kampf um Blond (1933) as Victor 
 Ripening Youth (1933) as Knud Sengebusch, Abiturient
 Die vom Niederrhein (1933) as Hans Steinherr
 Es tut sich was um Mitternacht (1934) as Nikolaus 'Nicki' Durmann
 Charley's Aunt (1934) as Jack Chesney
 Krach um Jolanthe (1934) as Wesemeier, der neue Lehrer
 Miss Liselott (1934) as Peter Wendt, Architekt
 Trouble with Jolanthe (1934) as Wesemeier, der neue Lehrer
 Eine Siebzehnjährige (1934) as Walter
 Glückspilze (1935) as Hans Berding
 Hermine and the Seven Upright Men (1935) as Karl
 Make Me Happy (1935) as William Davenport
 Carnival in Flanders (1936) as Johann Brueghel
 Kater Lampe (1936) as Fritz Neumerkel – Schnitzergeselle
 A Woman of No Importance (1936) as Gerald Arbuthnot
 Victoria the Great (1937) as Minor Role (uncredited)
 The Deacon and the Jewess (1939) as Simon
 Spy for a Day (1940) as Capt. Hausemann
 For Freedom (1940) as Fritz
 Convoy (1940) as U-Boat Commander U.37
 Let George Do It! (1940) as German Radio Operator (uncredited)
 Night Train to Munich (1940) as Concentration Camp Guard (uncredited)
 Neutral Port (1940) as Capt. Grosskraft
 Mr. Proudfoot Shows a Light (1941) as German
 Jeannie (1941) as Count von Wittgestein
 The Big Blockade (1942) as German: Gunter
 The Young Mr. Pitt (1942) as Talleyrand
 The Life and Death of Colonel Blimp (1943) as von Ritter
 The Yellow Canary (1943) as Captain Jan Orlock
 English Without Tears (1944) as Felix Dembrowski
 The Seventh Veil (1945) as Maxwell Leydon
 Beware of Pity (1946) as Lt. Anton Marek
 Frieda (1947) as Richard
 Sleeping Car to Trieste (1948) as Zurta
 Marry Me! (1949) as Louis (uncredited)
 The Dark Light (1951) as Mark
 Hotel Sahara (1951) as Lt von Heillicke 
 The Dubarry (1951) as Alfred Collien
 Klettermaxe (1952) as Max Malien 
 Fritz and Friederike (1952) as Henry de Voss
 Desperate Moment (1953) as Paul Ravitch
 The Rose of Stamboul (1953) as Achmed Bey
 Beloved Life (1953) as Joachim von Bolin
 Homesick for Germany (1954) as Fred Berger
 Spring Song (1954) as Dr. Andermatt
 The Confession of Ina Kahr (1954) as Dr. Pleyer
 The Song of Kaprun (1955) as Peter Dahle
 Des Teufels General (1955) as Oberst Friedrich Eilers
 Ripening Youth (1955) as Studienrat Dr. Crusius
 The Fisherman from Heiligensee (1955) as Wolfgang von Döring
 Night of Decision (1956) as Albert Vernon
 Loser Takes All (1956) as Hotel Manager 
 The House of Intrigue (1956) as Matt
 The Battalion in the Shadows (1957)
 All the Sins of the Earth (1958) as Judge
  (1958) as Pierre de Motestant
 Subway in the Sky (1959) as Carl
 Conspiracy of Hearts (1960) as Col. Horstein
 Brainwashed (1960) as Hartmann
 Foxhole in Cairo (1960) as Gen. Erwin Rommel
 Frau Irene Besser (1961)
 The Guns of Navarone (1961) as Commandant
 The Devil's Daffodil (1961) as Raymond Lyne
  (1962, TV miniseries) as Terry Morris
 Death Trap (Edgar Wallace Mysteries, 1962) as Paul Heindrick
 The Devil's Agent (1962), as Inspector Huebling
 Freddy and the Song of the South Pacific (1962) as Siebzehnstern
 Mystery Submarine (1963) as Captain Neymarck
 The Victors (1963) as Herr Metzger
 Death Drums Along the River (1963) as Dr. Franz Weiss 
 Traitor's Gate (1964) as Trayne
  (1965, TV miniseries) as Detective Inspector Hyde
 City of Fear (1965) as Dr. Paul Kovac
 African Gold (1965) as Karl Du Val
 The Avengers, episode 4-9 (A Surfeit of H2O) (1965) as Dr. Sturm
 The Gorilla of Soho (1968) as Henry Parker
  (1970, TV miniseries) as Gordon Stewart
 Die Feuerzangenbowle (1970) as Member of the Round table

ReferencesHalliwell's Who's Who in the Movies'', 14th edition, Harper Collins, 2001;

External links
 

1906 births
1971 deaths
20th-century German male actors
German male film actors
German male stage actors
German male television actors
German emigrants to England
People from East Prussia
People from Olsztynek
Exiles from Nazi Germany
German expatriate male actors in the United Kingdom